Regula Egger (born 10 January 1958) is a former Swiss female javelin thrower. She competed at the 1984 Summer Olympics

References 

1958 births
Living people
Athletes (track and field) at the 1984 Summer Olympics
Olympic athletes of Switzerland
Swiss female javelin throwers
People from Adliswil
Sportspeople from Zürich